Endrit Idrizaj (born 14 June 1989) is an Albanian football player who most recently played for KF Tirana in the Albanian Superliga.

Career

Tirana
Idrizaj left Bylis Ballsh during the 2013–14 season when they were expelled from the Albanian Superliga and he joined FK Kukësi during the summer transfer window  But he was still under contract with Bylis Ballsh and despite Idrizaj training with the rest of the Kukësi squad for a number of weeks, the move was never finalised as the clubs could not reach an agreement over the transfer fee. He then signed a three-year contract with KF Tirana for an undisclosed fee on 29 July 2014 and joined the team at their training camp in Ohrid, Macedonia.

On 28 January 2015 he agreed terms with Apolonia Fier to join the Albanian Superliga strugglers on loan until the end of the season in their bid to escape relegation. In only his 9th appearance into his loan spell, he was injured on 16 March 2015 in a league game against KF Laçi, and he soon needed surgery on his knee. His loan deal was cut short and Apolonia Fier were eventually relegated to the Albanian First Division, and Idrizaj continued his recovery at his parent club KF Tirana. He was not registered in the KF Tirana squad for the first half of the 2015–16 campaign, as he was still recovering from his knee injury, but he remained under contract with the club until the summer of 2017.

Idrizaj returned to professional football in January 2016, as he was registered in the KF Tirana squad and began training with the rest of the squad during the winter break in the hope of returning to match fitness since for the first time since his injury.

Career statistics

Club

References

1989 births
Living people
Footballers from Vlorë
Albanian footballers
Association football defenders
Flamurtari Vlorë players
Luftëtari Gjirokastër players
KF Vlora players
KF Himara players
KF Bylis Ballsh players
KF Tirana players
KF Apolonia Fier players
Kategoria Superiore players
Kategoria e Parë players